Oscar Chirimini (28 March 1917 – 3 April 1961) was a Uruguayan footballer. He played 21 matches for the Uruguay national football team from 1937 to 1944. He was also part of Uruguay's squad at 1941 South American Championship.

References

External links
 

1917 births
1961 deaths
Uruguayan footballers
Uruguay international footballers
Place of birth missing
Association football forwards
Club Atlético River Plate (Montevideo) players
Peñarol players